Adolf Birch-Hirschfeld (1 October 1849, in Kiel – 11 January 1917, in Gautzsch) was a German medievalist and Romance scholar. He was a brother of pathologist Felix Victor Birch-Hirschfeld.

He studied philology at the University of Leipzig as a pupil of Adolf Ebert and Friedrich Karl Theodor Zarncke. He received his habilitation in 1878, and for several years conducted research in Paris. In 1884 he became a professor of modern languages at the University of Giessen, and in 1891 returned to Leipzig as a professor of Romance philology.

Selected works 
 Die Sage vom Gral; ihre Entwicklung und dichterische Ausbildung in Frankreich und Deutschland im 12. und 13. Jahrhundert, 1877 – The story of the Grail; its development and poetic formation in France and Germany in the 12th and 13th centuries.
 Über die den provenzalischen Troubadours des zwölften und dreizehnten Jahrhunderts bekannten epischen Stoffe, 1878 – On the Provençal troubadours of the 12th and 13th centuries.
 Geschichte der französischen Litteratur seit Anfang des XVI. Jahrhunderts, 1889 – History of French literature since the beginning of the 16th century.
 Geschichte der französischen litteratur von den ältesten zeiten bis zur gegenwart (with Hermann Suchier, 1900) – History of French literature from the earliest times to the present.
 Das fünfte Buch des Pantagruel und sein Verhältnis zu den authentischen Büchern des Romans, 1901 – The fifth book of Pantagruel and its relationship to the authentic books of the novel. 
 Zum Gedächtnis an Richard Wülker, 1910 – In memory of Richard Paul Wülker.

References 

1849 births
1917 deaths
Writers from Kiel
Leipzig University alumni
Academic staff of Leipzig University
Academic staff of the University of Giessen
German medievalists
Romance philologists